The Opossum Run Branch was a former railroad line constructed by the Pennsylvania Railroad in 1884. It ran from New Haven, PA to West Leisenring, PA. It ran through the mining towns of Trotter, Leisenring and Monarch. The line was abandoned in the early to mid 1900s. Remnants of the line can still be found to this day, most notably in West Leisenring, where a few railroad bridges and a row of coke ovens still remain.

External links 
http://www.abandonedrails.com/Opossum_Run_Branch

Pennsylvania Railroad lines
Closed railway lines in the United States